The nomos, also nome, is a genre of ancient Greek music, either solo instrumental or for voice accompanied by an instrument, characterized by a style of great complexity. It came to be associated with virtuoso performers. Although it designates a specific, nameable melody, it is unclear just how fixed it might have been in detail. Most likely, each performer was given some freedom to vary and interpret the melody, using musical phrases and gestures that would change from one performance to another.

Etymology
The root sense of the Greek word νόμος is "that which is in habitual practice, use or possession"; its specific musical sense is "melody, strain". In the particular application to these melody types called nomoi, it may be translated as "set piece".

Types
There are four types of nomoi, two vocal and two purely instrumental:
 Kitharoedic nomoi, the earliest type, sung to the accompaniment of a kithara, associated with Terpander of Sparta (early seventh century BC)
 Auloedic nomoi, sung to the accompaniment of an aulos, first devised by Clonas or Ardalus of Troezen
 Auletic nomoi, extended compositions for solo aulos, introduced at the Pythian games in 586 BC
 Kitharistic nomoi, solo instrumental works for kithara, introduced at the Pythian games in 558 BC

Composers/performers
Chrysothemis of Crete, costumed as Apollo, was the first to sing a solo nomos, accompanying himself on the kithara. Lysias names as particularly skilled musicians in this genre Polymnestus, Olympus of Mysia, Mimnermus, and Sacadas.

References

Cited sources

Further reading
 Crusius, Otto. 1888. "Über die Nomosfrage". In Verhandlungen der 39. Versammlung deutscher Philologen und Schulmänner Zürich 1887, 258–76. Leipzig: B. G. Teubner.
 Del Grande, Carlo. 1923. "Nomos citarodico". Rivista Indo-Greca-Italica 7:1–17.
 Del Grande, Carlo. 1932. Espressione musicale dei poetici greci. Naples: R. Ricciardi.
 Greiser, Hans. 1937. Nomos: Ein Beitrag zur griechischen Musikgeschichte. Quellen und Studien zur Geschichte un Kultur des Altertums und des Mittelalters 5. Heidelberg: Prof. F. Bilabel.
 Jan, Karl von. 1879. "Auletischer und aulodischer Nomos". Jahrbücher für classische Philologie 119:577–92.
 Jan, Karl von. 1881. "Aulos und Nomos". Jahrbücher für classische Philologie 123:543–52.

Ancient Greek music
Music genres
Instrumental music